The Big Trees is a 1952 lumberjack Western film starring Kirk Douglas and directed by Felix E. Feist.  It was Kirk Douglas's final film for Warner Brothers, a film he did for free in exchange for the studio agreeing to release him from his long-term contract.

The film has fallen into the public domain. Douglas plays a greedy timber baron who seeks to exploit the sequoia forest, while facing the protest of the Quaker colonists.

Plot
In 1900, lumberman Jim Fallon (Kirk Douglas) greedily eyes the big redwood trees in the virgin region of northern California. The land is already settled by, among others, a religious group led by Elder Bixby (Charles Meredith) who have a religious relationship with the redwoods and refuse to log them, using smaller trees for lumber. Jim becomes infatuated with Bixby's daughter, Alicia (Eve Miller), though that does not change his plan to cheat the homesteaders. When Jim's right-hand man, Yukon Burns (Edgar Buchanan) finds out, he changes sides and leads the locals in resisting Jim. The locals combat Jim's loggers with a sympathetic judge with Jim fighting back by using Federal laws.

Elder Bixby is killed when a big sequoia tree is chopped down by Jim's men and falls on his cabin. Jim's desperate attempt to rescue Alicia's father saves him from being convicted of murder.  Meanwhile, timber rival Cleve Gregg (Harry Cording) appears on the scene, making it a three-way fight. Gregg and his partner Frenchy LeCroix (John Archer) try to assassinate Jim, but end up killing Yukon instead. Jim has a dramatic change of heart and leads the settlers in defeating Gregg and Frenchy. Afterwards, Jim marries Alicia and settles down.

Cast

 Kirk Douglas as Jim Fallon 
 Eve Miller as Sister Alicia Chadwick 
 Patrice Wymore as Daisy Fisher
 Edgar Buchanan as Yukon Burns
 John Archer as "Frenchy" LeCroix
 Alan Hale, Jr. as "Tiny"
 Roy Roberts as Judge Crenshaw
 Charles Meredith as Elder Bixby
 Harry Cording as Cleve Gregg
 Ellen Corby as Sister Blackburn
 Duke Watson as Mr. Murdoch
 Lane Chandler as Brother Dorn
 Elizabeth Slifer as Sister Wallace
 Lilian Bond as Daisy's girl
 Michael McHale as Mr Keller (an accountant) 
 William Challee as Brother Williams
Students from Humboldt State University played members of the Quaker congregation and members of its choir.

Production
The film was made with the cooperation of the Hammond and Carlotta Lumber companies, and was shot on locations in Humboldt County, California.

Footage from Warner Brothers' 1938 Technicolor film Valley of the Giants is used throughout The Big Trees. The Big Trees is not a precise remake, but shares useful plot points. The climactic explosion of a logjam makes use of the destruction of the dam in Valley of the Giants. Costumes were designed to match the images in several scenes, notably when the red-shirted hero in each picture works his way along a train carrying huge cut trees in order to stop the caboose carrying his love interest from plunging into a gorge. The white-shirted villain survived his battle with the hero in the earlier.  Alan Hale Jr. plays a lumberjack in this, wearing a very distinctive outfit—including a hat—like the one his father wears in Valley of the Giants. The Big Sky uses the long shot from Valley of the Giants of Ox (Alan Hale Sr.) sliding down a cable to have “Tiny” accomplish the same feat in this picture.

Reception
The New York Times called it a "stormy and sometimes silly saga" based on a script "not terribly far removed from the Warners Valley of the Giants"; its "plot and emoting seem to be as old as the giant redwoods with which they are concerned."

In a 1986 interview with David Letterman, this was one of two movies Kirk told the audience that they could skip in his filmography. The other was Along the Great Divide.

References

External links

 
 
 
 
 

1952 films
American historical drama films
Warner Bros. films
Films directed by Felix E. Feist
1952 drama films
1950s historical drama films
Films set in California
Films set in the 1900s
Films set in forests
Articles containing video clips
Films scored by Heinz Roemheld
Films set in the 20th century
Films about Quakers
Films about lumberjacks
1950s English-language films
1950s American films